Malaysia is scheduled to compete at the 2017 World Aquatics Championships in Budapest, Hungary from 14 July to 30 July. This was the first time Malaysia won gold at the World Aquatics Championships, with Cheong Jun Hoong winning gold in the Women's 10 m platform event.

Medalists

Diving

Malaysia has entered 8 divers (three male and five female).

Men

Women

Mixed

Synchronized swimming

Malaysia's synchronized swimming team consisted of 3 athletes (3 female).

Women

 Legend: (R) = Reserve Athlete

References

Nations at the 2017 World Aquatics Championships
Malaysia at the World Aquatics Championships
2017 in Malaysian sport